Daniel O'Keefe may refer to:

Daniel J. O'Keefe (born 1950), communications scholar and professor
Daniel O'Keefe (writer) (1928–2012), editor and author who invented Festivus

See also
Dan O'Keefe (disambiguation)
Daniel O'Keeffe (disambiguation)